California Proposition 4 may refer to:

 California Proposition 4 (1911)
 California Proposition 4 (2008)